Andrei Sergeyevich Mayboroda (born 20 September 1984) is a former Russian professional football player.

Club career
He played in the Russian Football National League for FC Baikal Irkutsk in the 2015–16 season.

External links
 
 

1984 births
Sportspeople from Krasnoyarsk
Living people
Russian footballers
Association football defenders
FC Krasnodar players
FC Yenisey Krasnoyarsk players
FC Dynamo Barnaul players
FC Baikal Irkutsk players